Gökçe Fırat Çulhaoğlu (born 8 March 1974) is the chairman of National Party and journalist. He is the Head-Columnist of Turkish Left. He was arrested and sent to prison with the accusation of "Insulting the President" on 31 May 2015, but released after 18 days of imprisonment. On 31 August 2016 he was detained again and accused of aiding a terrorist organization. He would have been released on 31 March 2017, if not on the same day a second prosecution was opened and he was again taken in custody. This time he was accused of wanting to "overthrow the government and the constitutional order" in the "FETÖ media leg" trial. On 8 March 2018, he was sentenced to 6 years and 3 months imprisonment for being a member of a terror organization.

He is the author of 22 books:
 Turkish Republic is Entrusted to Us
 Kuvayi Milliye: National and International Resources of Turkish Revolution
 The Colonization Assault of USA from Afghanistan to Iraq
 Turkish Ordeal: Kemalism and Defense of the Motherland 
 Roadmap of National Powers: "Independence or Death"
 Besieged by the Ally
 Six Arrows of Atatürk
 Genuine Kemalism
 National Leftist Ideology
 Kurdish-Islamist Fascism
 Invasion: Concealed Facts about the Kurdish Question and the Kurdish Invasion
 Exhausted Democrats: Remain Silent No More 
 Attaining to Mustapha Kemal
 Kemalism and Socialism
 My Martyr! My Courageous Lad! You didn't Die for No Reason
 Turkish Socialism – Kemalism: The Very Socialism in Demand
 Kurdish Racism and Fascism
 Kemalism against Collaboration: National Resolution
 Anatolia: The Turkish Motherland
 From the Slaughter of Janissaries to Ergenekon Plot: The Dissolution of Turkish Army
 We are the Soldiers of Mustapha Kemal Atatürk
 War of Parallel States
 Documentation of AKP-PKK Alliance

References 

1974 births
Leaders of political parties in Turkey
Living people
Pan-Turkists
Politicians from Istanbul
21st-century Turkish journalists
Turkish nationalists
Turkish non-fiction writers
Turkish political party founders
Prisoners and detainees of Turkey